The PFL 2 mixed martial arts event for the 2018 season of the Professional Fighters League was held on June 21, 2018, at the Chicago Theatre in Chicago, Illinois. It was the second regular season event of 2018 and included only fights in the lightweight and light heavyweight divisions.

Background
Rashid Magomedov was expected to face Jason High at this event, however Magomedev was removed from the bout due to injury and replaced by Efrain Escudero. On weigh in day, the fight suffered another set back as Escudero missed the 156-pound weight limit by six pounds. As a result, Escudero became ineligible to earn points regardless of the outcome.

Results

Standings after event
The point system consists of outcome based scoring and bonuses for an early win. Under the outcome based scoring system, the winner of a fight receives 3 points and the loser receives 0 points. If the fight ends in a draw, both fighters will receive 1 point. The bonus for winning a fight in the first, second, or third round is 3 points, 2 points, and 1 point respectively. For example, if a fighter wins a fight in the first round, then the fighter will receive 6 total points. If a fighter misses weight, then the fighter that missed weight will receive 0 points and his opponent will receive 3 points due to a walkover victory.

Lightweight

Although Efrain Escudero won his fight, he was ineligible to earn point due to missing the weight limit.  By rule, the loser, Jason High, is credited with three points for walkover.

Light Heavyweight

See also
List of PFL events
List of current PFL fighters

References

Professional Fighters League
Events in Chicago
2018 in mixed martial arts
Mixed martial arts in Chicago
2018 in sports in Illinois
June 2018 sports events in the United States